The 2016–17 Irish Super League season was the 44th running of Basketball Ireland's premier men's basketball competition. The season featured 12 teams from across the Republic of Ireland and Northern Ireland, with the regular season beginning on 23 September 2016 and ending on 19 March 2017. During the 2016 off-season, Basketball Ireland expanded its top flight men's league to 12 teams, with new team Tralee Warriors entering and Dublin side KUBS being granted promotion from the Men's Division One. With a first-place finish and a 20–2 win–loss record, Templeogue were crowned league champions for the first time in their history. 2017 National Cup honours went to Swords Thunder, who collected their first piece of silverware in the top flight league, while Tralee were crowned the winners of the season finale Champions Trophy tournament after defeating Templeogue in the final.

Teams

Regular season

Champions Trophy

Bracket

*National League Division 1 champions.

**National League Division 1 runners-up.

Quarter-finals

Source: Basketball Ireland, Basketball Ireland

Semi-finals

Source: Basketball Ireland Basketball Ireland

Final

National Cup

Round 1 (2 legs)

Round 2 (1 leg)
Winner of Series 5 vs Winner of Series 4

Winner of Series 6 vs Winner of Series 3

Semi-finals
Winner of Series 1 vs Winner of Game 2, Round 2

Winner of Game 1, Round 2 vs Winner of Series 2

Final

Source: Basketball Ireland

Awards

Player of the Month

Coach of the Month

Statistics leaders
Stats as of the end of the regular season

Regular season
 Player of the Year: Trae Pemberton (Tralee Warriors)
 Young Player of the Year: Ryan Leonard (Tralee Warriors)
 Coach of the Year: Mark Bernsen (Tralee Warriors)
 All-Star First Team:
 Trae Pemberton (Tralee Warriors)
 José María Gil Narbón (Swords Thunder)
 Lorcan Murphy (Templeogue)
 Jermaine Turner (Killester)
 Michael Bonaparte (Templeogue)
 All-Star Second Team:
 Dillon Stith (Belfast Star)
 Mike Garrow (UCD Marian)
 Kevin Foley (KUBS)
 Jason Killeen (Templeogue)
 Isaac Westbrooks (Swords Thunder)
 All-Star Third Team:
 Kieran Donaghy (Tralee Warriors)
 Corbin Jackson (KUBS)
 Keelan Cairns (Belfast Star)
 Mārtiņš Provizors (DCU Saints)
 Ryan Leonard (Tralee Warriors)

References

External links
Season preview at ballineurope.com
Player ins and outs at basketballireland.ie
National Cup draw

Irish
Super League (Ireland) seasons
Basket
Basket